The 2013 East–West Shrine Game was the 88th staging of the all-star college football exhibition game featuring NCAA Division I Football Bowl Subdivision players and a few select invitees from Canadian university football. The game featured over 100 players from the 2012 college football season, and prospects for the 2013 Draft of the professional National Football League (NFL). In the week prior to the game, scouts from all 32 NFL teams attended.  The proceeds from the East–West Shrine Game benefit Shriners Hospitals for Children. Jerry Glanville and Leeman Bennett were named coaches on December 5, 2012. The game was played on January 19, 2013, at Tropicana Field in St. Petersburg, Florida; the West defeated the East, 28–13.

Players

East Team

Offense

Defense

Specialists

West Team

Offense

Defense

Specialists

Game summary

Scoring summary

Statistics

Source:

2013 NFL Draft

Of the players that participated in the 2013 East–West Shrine Game, 35 were drafted during the 2013 NFL Draft. The highest player drafted that played in the game was Christine Michael who was selected by the Seattle Seahawks in the second round (62nd overall).

References

Further reading
 

East-West Shrine Game
East–West Shrine Bowl
American football in Florida
Sports competitions in St. Petersburg, Florida
January 2013 sports events in the United States
East-West Shrine Game